The Ghost of Frankenstein is a 1942 American horror film directed by Erle C. Kenton and starring Cedric Hardwicke, Lon Chaney Jr. and Bela Lugosi. It is the fourth film in the Frankenstein series by Universal Pictures, and the follow-up to Son of Frankenstein (1939). The film's plot follows the previous film's: Frankenstein's Monster (Lon Chaney Jr.) and his companion Ygor (Bela Lugosi) are chased out of town. They go to another small town to encourage the younger son of Henry Frankenstein ( Cedric Hardwicke) to continue his father's experiments, so that Ygor can have revenge against his enemies and his brain transplanted into the Monster's skull.

The film was the first in the series with Chaney portraying the monster and was cast one day after the film was announced by Universal. It began production in December 1941 and finished in January 1942. On its release it received praise as being as strong as the previous films from The Hollywood Reporter and The Motion Picture Herald while it received negative reviews from New York Daily News and The New York Times.

Plot
The residents of the village of Frankenstein feel they are under a curse and blame all their troubles on Frankenstein's monster. The Mayor allows them to destroy Frankenstein's castle. Ygor finds the monster released from his sulfuric tomb by the explosions. The exposure to the sulfur weakened yet preserved the monster. Ygor and the monster flee the castle, and the monster is struck by a bolt of lightning. Ygor decides to find Ludwig, the second son of Henry Frankenstein, to help the monster regain his strength. Ludwig Frankenstein is a doctor who, along with his assistants Dr. Kettering and Dr. Theodore Bohmer, has a successful practice in Visaria. Bohmer was formerly Ludwig's teacher but is now his envious assistant. Ygor and the monster arrive in Visaria, where the monster befriends a young girl, Cloestine Hussman. The monster carries her onto a roof to retrieve her ball, killing two villagers who attempt to intervene. After Cloestine asks the monster to bring her back down, the monster returns the girl to her father Herr Hussman and is immediately captured by police. The town prosecutor, Erik Ernst, comes to Ludwig and asks him to examine the giant they have captured. Before he can, Ygor visits Ludwig and informs him that the giant is the monster. Ygor implores Ludwig to heal the monster's body and brain. Ludwig refuses, so Ygor blackmails him with the threat of revealing Ludwig's ancestry to the villagers.

At the police station, the monster is restrained with chains as a hearing is conducted to investigate the murder of the villagers. When Ludwig denies recognizing the monster, it breaks free in a fit of rage, and is led away by Ygor. Elsa, Ludwig's daughter, finds the Frankenstein journals and learns the story of the monster. She sees Ygor and the monster in the window, and after breaking into Ludwig's laboratory, the monster kills Dr. Kettering. The monster grabs Elsa, but Ludwig is able to subdue him with knockout gas. Ludwig is examining the monster when it awakens and tries to kill him. Ludwig tranquilizes the monster and then tries to enlist Bohmer's aid in dissecting him. Bohmer refuses, claiming it would be murder. While studying his family's journals, Ludwig is visited by the ghost of his father, Henry Frankenstein. The spirit implores him to supply the monster with a good brain. Ludwig calls in Bohmer and Ygor and tells them that he plans to put the deceased Dr. Kettering's brain into the monster's skull. Ygor protests that he'll lose his friend, and asks Ludwig to use his brain. Ludwig refuses because of Ygor's sinister nature. Elsa begs Ludwig to stop his experiments, but he chooses to operate on the monster as soon as possible. Ygor tells Bohmer that he should not be subordinate to Ludwig. Ygor promises to help the disgraced doctor if he agrees to put Ygor's brain into the monster.

The police soon arrive at Ludwig's house, searching for the monster. They find the secret room, but Ygor and the monster have fled. The monster abducts Cloestine from her home and returns with her in his arms to Ludwig's chateau. The monster conveys his desire for her brain to be placed in his head. Cloestine does not want to lose her brain, and the monster reluctantly gives her to Elsa. Ludwig then performs the surgery, not knowing that Bohmer has removed Ygor's brain, not Kettering's. In the village, Herr Hussman rouses his neighbors by surmising his daughter has been captured by the monster and that Ludwig is harboring it. Ludwig shows the monster to Erik, but when the monster rises, Ludwig is shocked to hear that it has Ygor's voice. The villagers storm the chateau and the Ygor-Monster decides to have Bohmer fill the house with gas to kill them. Ludwig tries to stop him, but the Ygor-Monster repels the attack and mortally wounds Ludwig. The Ygor-Monster suddenly goes blind, a tragic complication due to a mismatch in blood type, according to Ludwig. Feeling betrayed, the Ygor-Monster then throws Bohmer onto the apparatus, electrocuting him, and inadvertently sets fire to the chateau. The Ygor-Monster becomes trapped in the burning chateau while Erik and Elsa escape, walking out into the sunrise.

Cast and Characters

Production

The Ghost of Frankenstein was announced from Universal Pictures on November 13, 1941, searching for a new lead to play the title role of the monster. Originally Boris Karloff had been planned to reprise his role as Frankenstein's Monster but had scheduling conflicts with Arsenic and Old Lace. The next day, producer George Waggner was instructed to order the same type of make-up that Karloff wore for the new actor portraying the monster with instructions that changing the appearance may "kill the interest of Frankenstein follower". Lon Chaney, Jr. was chosen for the role of the Monster. 
The film, which follows the storyline set up in Son of Frankenstein, was the fourth part of Universal's Frankenstein series and was the last film in the series with Frankenstein's Monster as the sole monster.

Early versions of the script were written by Eric Taylor, and included elements not used in the film, such as the return of Basil Rathbone's character from Son of Frankenstein. Parts that existed in Taylor's original script included the Monster's bond with children, villagers storming a castle, a brain transplant sequence, and a fiery demise of the monster. Universal submitted its script to the Production Code Association under the title There's Always Tomorrow. The censors there warned against excessive violence and reminded the studio that scenes set in Frankenstein's operating room and insanity ward would be deleted in England.

The film went into production on December 14, 1941. Chaney suffered a severe allergic reaction to the monster makeup applied by Jack Pierce and missed several days of shooting. Janet Ann Gallow, who played Cloestine Hussman in the film, spoke about working with Chaney in 2005, stating that she spent a lot of time with Chaney, "riding his legs, his knees, sitting on his lap. He was nice, gentle with me and easy to work with - better than anyone else!"
She found working with Chaney was like working with a "favourite uncle". When Gallow's mother died in 1946, Chaney offered to adopt her and her brother, which Gallow's father did not consent to. Filming completed production in early January 1942.

Release
The Ghost of Frankenstien was distributed by the  Universal Pictures Company on March 13, 1942. The film was banned in Denmark when Universal tried to release it there in 1948.

The Ghost of Frankenstein was released on DVD as part of The Monster Legacy Collection and Frankenstein: The Legacy Collection on April 27, 2004. It was released again as a double feature with Son of Frankenstein on July 24, 2007.

Reception
From contemporary reviews, an anonymous reviewer from The Hollywood Reporter found the film can "stand on an imaginative par with all of its interest-gripping, quasi-scientific predecessors" and that Erle C. Kenton's direction "makes magnificent use of every element of suspense". Another anonymous reviewer in The Motion Picture Herald opined that the film "maintains a standard of performance, effectiveness and quality exceeding the average for horror films by a considerable margin". Wanda Hale of The New York Daily News  described the film as "horrid, not horrendous and horribly boring even though a lot of good players [...] do the best they can with the dreadful material". Bosley Crowther of The New York Times declared that the thought of Frankenstein's Monster returning in another film following The Ghost of Frankenstein "fills us with mortal terror. That is the most fearful prospect which the picture manages to convey".

From retrospective reviews, the authors of Universal Horrors noted that like The Mummy's Hand, the film showed Universal was "less interested in producing horror films than it was in churning out mere "monster movies" finding that horror films "at their best, offer a wide palette of interesting possibilities (nuance of character, hints of subtext, echoes of the folklore or literature that inspired it)" while "monster movies" removed "subtlety to serve hard-sell horror in the form of grotesque makeup, swooning heroines and/or rip-roaring action" and that The Ghost of Frankenstein offers "monster movie making at its classy best", noting that Son of Frankenstein was "a better film by any standard" and that while Ghost of Frankenstein was not as embraced by fans, "any criticism directed against [Ghost of Frankenstein] is deflected by the fact that it's so much fun to watch". Craig Butler of AllMovie noted that the film was "a significant decline" for the series but "it's still passable entertainment (something that is not necessarily true of some later entries in the series)". Butler specifically noted Chaney as the monster was "not exactly bad (and certainly better than others who have played the part), but he lacks the special magic that Karloff brought to the role; too often, he seems to be doing a Karloff imitation" and that "the rest of the cast is quite good, especially Bela Lugosi, turning in a delightful performance as Ygor, and an enjoyable Lionel Atwill. There's not much that anyone can do, however, with a script that is cobbled together with bits and pieces taken from here and there, or with direction that is efficient but bland".

In 2005, the American Film Institute nominated Hans J. Salter's score for The Ghost of Frankenstein to be on their list of  AFI's 100 Years of Film Scores.

See also
 List of films featuring Frankenstein's monster
 Frankenstein in popular culture

References

Footnotes

Sources

External links

 
 

1942 films
1942 horror films
1940s science fiction horror films
American black-and-white films
American science fiction horror films
American sequel films
Films about brain transplants
Films directed by Erle C. Kenton
Films set in castles
Frankenstein (Universal film series)
Universal Pictures films
Films scored by Hans J. Salter
Films set in Europe
1940s English-language films
1940s American films